Pine Valley is a locality in the Snowy Monaro Region, New South Wales, Australia. It is located to the south of the Snowy Mountains Highway, to the immediate southwest of Cooma.

References

Snowy Monaro Regional Council
Localities in New South Wales